The 1936 United States presidential election in New Mexico took place on November 3, 1936. All contemporary forty-eight states were part of the 1936 United States presidential election. State voters chose three electors to represent them in the Electoral College, which voted for President and Vice President.

New Mexico was won by incumbent President Franklin D. Roosevelt in a 26-point landslide against Kansas Governor Alf Landon. Roosevelt won every county in the state save Socorro County: this is the last time a Democrat has ever carried Lincoln County, which is easily the longest run of voting Republican of any New Mexico county.

Union Party candidate William Lemke made a small splash in New Mexico and elsewhere in the United States, winning 924 votes, 0.5 percent of the state’s total, substantially less than he won in many other states like Rhode Island, Oregon and his home state of North Dakota.

Results

Results by county

References

New Mexico
1936 New Mexico elections
1936